Martín Arrau García-Huidobro (born 6 March 1979) is a Chilean engineer who is member of the Chilean Constitutional Convention. He previously served as intendant of the Ñuble Region.

References

External links
 Official website

Living people
1970 births
21st-century Chilean politicians
Pontifical Catholic University of Chile alumni
Independent Democratic Union politicians
Members of the Chilean Constitutional Convention